The Number 13-class battleship was a planned class of four fast battleships to be built for the Imperial Japanese Navy (IJN) during the 1920s. The ships never received any names, being known only as Numbers 13–16. They were intended to reinforce Japan's "eight-eight fleet" of eight battleships and eight battlecruisers after the United States announced a major naval construction program in 1919. The Number 13 class was designed to be superior to all other existing battleships, planned or building. After the signing of the Washington Naval Treaty in 1922, they were cancelled in November 1923 before construction could begin.

Design and background

By 1918, the Navy had gained approval for an "eight-six" fleet, all ships under eight years old. However, having four large battleships and four battlecruisers on order put an enormous financial strain on Japan, which was spending about a third of its national budget on the Navy. Despite this, the IJN gained approval of the "eight-eight-eight" plan in 1920 after American President Woodrow Wilson announced plans in 1919 to re-initiate the 1916 plan for ten additional battleships and six battlecruisers. The Japanese response required the construction of eight additional fast battleships in the Kii and the Number 13 classes.

When designing the latter class, the Japanese followed the doctrine that they had used since the First Sino-Japanese War of 1894–1895 of compensating for quantitative inferiority with qualitative superiority. In the words of naval historian Siegfried Breyer, "had [the ships] been completed, they would have been the world's largest and most powerful battleships. Their gun calibre alone would have caused a new and more intensive naval arms race. From an engineering aspect they were more than ten years ahead of their time because they anticipated the characteristics of the fully developed, fast battleship." Naval architects William Garzke and Robert Dulin concur saying, "These ships would have completely outclassed any European battleship".

The Number 13 class was designed by Captain Yuzuru Hiraga, the naval architect responsible for most of the previous Japanese capital ships. The ships were based on his previous Kii-class battleship and  designs, enlarged to take  guns.

Description

The class was intended to be equipped with four Gijutsu-Hombu geared steam turbines, each of which drove one propeller shaft.

The primary armament of the Number 13 class was eight 50-caliber 460-millimeter guns in four twin-gun turrets, two each superfiring fore and aft of the superstructure. The secondary battery consisted of 16 single 50-caliber  guns mounted in casemates in the superstructure. The ships' anti-aircraft defenses consisted of either four or eight single 45-caliber  10th Year Type anti-aircraft guns mounted around the single funnel. Each of these guns had a maximum elevation of +75° and a maximum rate of fire of 10–11 rounds per minute.

Construction
After the end of World War I, the United Kingdom, the United States and the Empire of Japan all announced large capital ship building programs, incorporating design lessons from the war. These ships would have been much larger and more expensive than earlier vessels and President Warren G. Harding called a conference at Washington, D. C. in late 1921 to forestall a very expensive arms race. The attendees at the conference agreed to limit capital ship construction for the next decade and scrapped large numbers of existing ships as well as many ships still under construction. Japan suspended the Number 13 class while the conference was in progress before any ship was laid down and formally cancelled them on 19 November 1923. As construction of the ships was scheduled to begin in 1922, and completed by 1927, they were already allocated to specific shipyards:

Footnotes

References

External links

 World Battleships List: Japanese Dreadnoughts

Battleship classes
Battleships of the Imperial Japanese Navy
Proposed ships